Vrion may refer to:
 Vrion, Berat, a settlement near Berat, in Albania
 Vrion, Sarandë, a settlement near Sarandë in Albania

See also
 Vrioni, a surname (and list of people with the name)